This is a list of weapons used by the Portuguese military during World War II. Portugal remained neutral until 1944 when it cooperated with the Allies as a non-belligerent. However the leader of Portugal during World War II  as well as during the Spanish civil war António de Oliveira Salazar said at the outbreak of World War II that the 550 year old Anglo-Portuguese Alliance was still intact and that Portugal would come to Britain's aid if they requested it but as they did not they would remain neutral. The alliance most likely meant that Portugal while being neutral until 1944 was from the beginning of the war in favour of the Allies.

Small arms

Rifles 
 Mauser Karabiner 98k
 Mauser–Vergueiro m/1904-39
 Portuguese-Mannlicher M1896 Portuguese licensed production
 Steyr-Kropatschek M1886/89 Portuguese licensed production for colonial troops
 Lee-Enfield No.1 Mk III* m/917 Remnants of British military aid in WW1
 M1917 Enfield

Pistols 
 Luger P08
 Savage M1907 Portuguese licensed production
 Walther P38
 Mauser C96
 Walther PP

Revolvers 
 Smith & Wesson M1899 Military
 Smith & Wesson No. 3
 Saint Etienne M1892

Light machine guns 
 MG 13
 Lewis Mk I Remnants of British military aid in WW1
 Madsen M1936
 Lewis M1917 
 MG 34

Machine guns 
 Vickers Mk I Remnants of British military aid in WW1
 Browning M1919A4
 Breda mod. 37 M/938 portuguese designation

Submachine guns 
 Steyr MP 34
STEN Mk II m/43 portuguese designation
Bergmann MP 18/I

Artillery

Field artillery 

 Canon de 75 modèle 1897
 Ordnance QF 25-pounder
 M101 howitzer

Mountain artillery 

 Obice da 75/18 modello 34

Armoured fighting vehicles(AFVs) 

 Carden Loyd tankette
 Vickers 6-Ton
 Humber Armoured Car
 Valentine tank

See also
 List of Portuguese military equipment of World War II
 List of common World War II infantry weapons

References

Portugal World War II
Lists
World War II